Porricondyla media is a species of fly in the family Cecidomyiidae. It can breed in the fruit bodies of the false morel, Verpa bohemica.

References

Cecidomyiidae
Insects described in 1981